Leopoldau may refer to:

 Leopoldau, Vienna, a subdistrict of Floridsdorf in Vienna, Austria
 Leopoldau (Vienna U-Bahn), a station on line U1
 Wien Leopoldau railway station